The 2017–18 Copa del Rey was the 116th staging of the Copa del Rey (including two seasons where two rival editions were played).  The winners were assured a place for the 2018–19 UEFA Europa League group stage.

Barcelona were the three-time defending champions, and successfully defended their title following a 5–0 win over Sevilla in the final. Times up to 28 October 2017 and from 25 March 2018 are CEST (UTC+2). Times from 29 October 2017 to 24 March 2018 are CET (UTC+1).

Schedule and format

Notes
Double-match rounds enforced the away goals rule, single-match rounds did not.
Games ending in a tie were decided in extra time, and if still level, by a penalty shoot-out.

Qualified teams
The following teams qualified for the competition. Reserve teams were excluded.

First round
The draw for the first and the second round was held on 28 July 2017 at 13:00 CEST in La Ciudad del Fútbol, RFEF headquarters, in Las Rozas, Madrid. In this round, 32 teams from the 2016–17 Segunda División B and ten from the 2016–17 Tercera División teams gained entry. In the draw, firstly six teams from Segunda División B received a bye and then, the remaining teams this league and teams from Tercera División faced according to proximity criteria by next groups:

Atlético Baleares, Racing Ferrol, Hércules, Alcoyano, Fuenlabrada, Mallorca, and Mérida received a bye to the second round.

Second round
Formentera received a bye for the third round.

Third round
Lleida Esportiu received a bye for the round of 32.

Final phase 
The draw for the Round of 32 was held on 28 September 2017, in La Ciudad del Fútbol, Las Rozas de Madrid. In this round, all La Liga teams entered the competition.

Round of 32 pairings were as follows: the seven remaining teams participating in the 2016–17 Segunda División B and Tercera División faced the 2017–18 La Liga teams which qualified for European competitions. The five remaining teams participating in Segunda División faced five La Liga teams which did not qualify for European competitions. The remaining eight La Liga teams faced each other. In matches involving teams from different league tiers, the team in the lower tier played the first leg at home. This rule will also be applied in the Round of 16, but not for the Quarter-finals and Semi-finals, in which the order of legs will be based on the luck of the draw.

Bracket

Round of 32

|}

First leg

Second leg

Round of 16

|}

First leg

Second leg

Quarter-finals

|}

First leg

Second leg

Semi-finals

|}

First leg

Second leg

Final

Top goalscorers

References

External links
Royal Spanish Football Federation official website
Copa del Rey at LFP website
Copa del Rey at BDFútbol

2017-18
1